Georgios Prountzos (born 19 August 2003) is a Greek professional footballer who plays as a midfielder for Super League club Asteras Tripolis.

References

2003 births
Living people
Greek footballers
Super League Greece players
Asteras Tripolis F.C. players
Association football midfielders
People from Kos
Sportspeople from the South Aegean